William Franklin Endicott (September 4, 1918 – November 26, 2016) was an American baseball left fielder who played briefly for the St. Louis Cardinals during the  season. His professional baseball career spanned 1937 through 1947, with four seasons (1942–1945) missed during United States Army service in World War II.

With the 1946 Cardinals, Endicott posted a .200 batting average (4-for-20) with two runs and three RBI in 20 major league games; his four hits included three doubles, and a .333 on-base percentage without home runs. He did not appear in the 1946 World Series, won by the Cardinals in seven games over the Boston Red Sox.

He died in November 2016 at the age of 98.

See also
1946 St. Louis Cardinals season

References

External links

Retrosheet

1918 births
2016 deaths
Albany Travelers players
Albuquerque Cardinals players
Baseball players from Missouri
Houston Buffaloes players
Major League Baseball left fielders
Mobile Shippers players
People from Ripley County, Missouri
Sacramento Solons players
St. Louis Cardinals players
United States Army personnel of World War II